This is a list of bands that perform symphonic black metal, a form of black metal music that incorporates symphonic and orchestral styles and instrumentation.

List of bands

References 

Lists of black metal bands